Mary Robinson (born 1944) was President of Ireland from 1990 to 1997 and United Nations High Commissioner for Human Rights from 1997 to 2002.

Mary Robinson may also refer to:

Mary Robinson (poet) (1757–1800), English actress, poet, and novelist
Agnes Mary Frances Robinson (later Duclaux; 1857–1944) English poet and literary critic; most frequently cited as Mary F. Robinson
Mary Robinson (British politician) (born 1955), British Conservative Party politician, MP for Cheadle since May 2015
Mary Robinson (Maid of Buttermere) (1778–1837), "The Maid of Buttermere", subject of Melvyn Bragg's novel of that name
Mary Kapuahualani Robinson (1896/7-1978), Hawaii Territorial Senator and businesswoman
Mary Lou Robinson (1926–2019), United States federal judge

Ships
Mary Robinson (clipper), 1854 clipper ship in the San Francisco and guano trades

See also
Mary Robison (born 1949), American fiction writer